Chitty Chitty Bang Bang is a musical with music and lyrics written by Richard and Robert Sherman and a book by Jeremy Sams. It is sometimes referred to as Chitty the Musical to distinguish it from the 1968 film of the same name on which it is based, written by Roald Dahl, Ken Hughes, and Richard Maibaum. The 1968 film was based in turn on the book of the same name by Ian Fleming. The show premiered at the London Palladium on April 16, 2002, directed by Adrian Noble before opening on Broadway in 2005.

Plot
Act One
The Junkman/Coggins recounts the last race of the Paragon Panther ("Opening"), which was contested against the Vulgarian Vulture in the 1910 British Grand Prix, but the Panther crashed after Vulgarian spies sabotaged it. Years later, the Panther sits in a junkyard, forgotten by all save the young siblings Jeremy and Jemima Potts, who are enamored with the Junkman's tales and the car's history. They are shocked when the Junkman tells them he plans to scrap it, but he promises to save the Panther for them if they can purchase and move it within a few weeks. Truly Scrumptious, daughter of the wealthy Lord Scrumptious, arrives at the junkyard seeking a spare part, but upon finding the truant children, takes them home to their father, the widowed inventor Caractacus. Meanwhile, Vulgarian spies acting under the direction of their leader, autocratic Baron Bomburst, have discovered the location of the Panther and make plans to purchase the car before the children.

Truly arrives at the Potts household, an old windmill, with the children and lectures Caractacus on their improper upbringing before leaving; as he prepares a meal for the children ("You Two"), they tell him about the plans to scrap the Panther and he promises to purchase the car for them. Caractacus's father, Grampa Potts, recounts the family's troubles ("Them Three") and after trying some of his son's inventions, realizes he has devised a candy that can be played like a flute. The next day, Caractacus goes to Lord Scrumptious's candy factory to sell the design and raise the money needed for the Panther. Truly helps the Potts family make their sales pitch ("Toot Sweets"), but the demonstration ends in disaster as the musical boiled sweets unintentionally summon many stray dogs who invade the factory. The Vulgarian spies decide to pass themselves off as locals ("Think Vulgar" / "Act English") as they realize the patriotic Junkman will never sell the Panther to Vulgarians. Dispirited from the Scrumptious Sweet Factory debacle, Caractacus sings a lullaby to the children ("Hushabye Mountain") and decides to try selling another invention tomorrow.

In the morning, Caractacus brings another invention, his automatic hair-cutting machine, to a local fair ("Come to the Funfair"), but the first demonstration again goes awry, as the hapless inventor's machine shaves the prospective client nearly bald. Caractacus escapes the wrathful client by joining a spirited morris dance group ("Me Ol' Bamboo") and the hair-cutting machine is sold instead to a turkey farmer, who plans to use it to pluck and cook his birds, giving Caractacus the money he needs to purchase the Panther. After purchasing the derelict racer and towing it home, Caractacus performs an intensive restoration while Grandpa and the children maintain the household ("Posh!"); after several days, Caractacus emerges from the workshop with the beautifully refurbished car, which they decide to take for a drive with Truly. Collectively, they rename the car Chitty Chitty Bang Bang for the unusual noises made by the engine ("Chitty Chitty Bang Bang"), and the four go for a seaside picnic.

During the picnic, the children confess their love to Truly ("Truly Scrumptious"), who reciprocates and realizes she has feelings for Caractacus as well; distracted by their emotions, the adults fail to notice they have become stranded by the rising tide, but Chitty demonstrates its amphibious capabilities by transforming into a boat ("Chitty Chitty Bang Bang" (nautical reprise)) as the Vulgarians attempt to capture the car and the Potts make a clean escape with Truly. Learning the car is also a boat both infuriates Baron Bomburst and renews his desire to own it. The Vulgarians arrive at the Potts family windmill first, though, and believing mistakenly that Grandpa is responsible for the wonders of Chitty, they hook his hut from an airship, kidnapping him inside. The rest of the family arrive with Truly in time to see them taking off with Grandpa. Speeding in pursuit, Chitty goes over a cliff but in another remarkable display, transforms into an aircraft ("Chitty Takes Flight") and follows the airship, hut, and Grandpa back to Vulgaria.

Act Two
Upon his arrival in Vulgaria ("Vulgarian National Anthem"), Grandpa is forced by Baron Bomburst to give the Baron's car floating and flying capabilities like Chitty, working with other inventors previously kidnapped by the Baron. After learning they have failed for years to accomplish this, Grandpa despairs but is cheered by his fellow prisoners, who see their failures merely as learning experiences ("The Roses of Success"). Chitty arrives shortly afterwards bearing Truly and the three remaining Potts; the Toymaker hustles them into his workshop just as the Childcatcher rushes to their landing site, suspecting the presence of children, who are banned in Vulgaria ("Kiddy-Widdy-Winkies"). As Caractacus learns that to comply, the citizens of Vulgaria have sent their children underground to live in the sewers, the Childcatcher tricks Truly and imprisons Jeremy and Jemima.

While the Baron and Baroness prepare for his birthday party ("Chu-Chi Face"), Caractacus, Truly, and the Toymaker devise a plan to rescue the children and Grandpa; having learned of Vulgaria's misery, Caractacus and Truly vow to end the Baron's rule ("Teamwork"). The Baroness's party plans come to fruition ("The Bombie Samba") as the Toymaker brings in Truly and Caractacus, disguised as life-size dolls that he winds up; they begin to sing ("Doll on a Music Box" / "Truly Scrumptious" (reprise)), distracting the Baron as the children of Vulgaria rush from the sewers and overpower the Baron's henchmen. The Potts children and Grandpa are rescued ("Us Two" / "Chitty Prayer"). The Toymaker banishes the Baron and Baroness from Vulgaria and the children from underground are reunited with their families ("Teamwork" (reprise)). Caractacus and Truly declare their love for each other as they fly back to the windmill ("Chitty Flies Home").

Productions

Original London production (2002–2005) 

The musical premiered in the West End at the London Palladium on April 16, 2002, with six new songs by the Sherman Brothers who wrote the original Academy Award-nominated title and song score as well. The West End production was directed by Adrian Noble (at the time the artistic director of the Royal Shakespeare Company) with musical staging and choreography by Gillian Lynne and featured Michael Ball (Caractacus Potts), Emma Williams (Truly Scrumptious), Anton Rodgers (Grandpa Potts), George Gillies (Jeremy), Carrie Fletcher (Jemima) and Graham Hoadly (The Commentator). Closing in September 2005, it was the longest running show ever at the London Palladium, taking in over £70 million in its three and a half year run. The Palladium's famous revolving stage (as seen on Sunday Night at the London Palladium) was entirely taken out to accommodate the technology and storage space for the flying Chitty car, identified by Guinness World Records as the most-expensive stage prop, costing .

Original Broadway production (2005) 
The Broadway production opened on April 28, 2005, at the Lyric Theatre (then the Hilton Theatre), garnering good reviews only for the lavish sets. Ben Brantley in The New York Times noted that the show "naggingly recalls the cold, futurist milieus of movies like 'Modern Times' and 'Metropolis,' in which machines rule the universe" and featured songs that sounded "not unlike what you might hear in sing-along hour in a pre-K class". The production was again directed by Adrian Noble with choreography by Gillian Lynne and starred Raúl Esparza (Caractacus Potts), Erin Dilly (Truly Scrumptious), Philip Bosco (Grandpa Potts), Marc Kudisch (Baron Bomburst), Jan Maxwell (Baroness Bomburst), Ellen Marlow (Jemima Potts), and Henry Hodges (Jeremy Potts). The Broadway production closed on December 31, 2005, after 34 previews and 285 regular performances. According to producer Nicholas Paleologos, "A substantial portion of the $15 million (initial investment) will not be recouped on Broadway."

A US national tour began in November 2008 at the Broward Center in Ft. Lauderdale, Florida, with a revised script by Ray Roderick, who was the tour director. These revisions have since become part of the licensed script. The original US touring prop car is now under exclusive ownership by Tony Garofalo of New York City, released by Big League Productions and currently being used for private display use as well as fundraising events. This prop vehicle is a full-sized version and fully equipped with many hydraulically activated stage tricks, such as surround stage mounted lighting, retractable wings, and spinning 45-degree tilt tires.

Subsequent UK touring productions

2005-07 UK tour and Singapore 

Since closing in London, Chitty Chitty Bang Bang  toured around the UK, stopping in Sunderland (December 9, 2005 – March 4, 2006), Manchester (March 20 – June 10, 2006), Birmingham (June 23 – September 2, 2006), Liverpool (September 18 – November 18, 2006), Edinburgh (December 1, 2006 – February 24, 2007), Bristol (March 9 – June 9, 2007) and Southampton (June 25 – September 15, 2007), Bradford (February 11 – April 5, 2008), Sunderland (April 17 – June 7, 2008), Cardiff (July 3 – August 30, 2008). The UK tour visited Asia for the first time when it opened on November 2, 2007, in Singapore's Esplanade – Theatres on the Bay. Encouraging ticket sales resulted in an extension of the show to December 9, adding 24 more shows to a run which was originally planned to end on November 18, 2007.

2009-10 UK tour 
In 2009, the original production toured the UK and Ireland until 2010 on a smaller scale, directed by original director Adrian Noble and choreographed by David Morgan. This tour used the script revisions used for the US tour by Ray Roderick. The tour opened in Plymouth at the Theatre Royal on July 3, 2009, and played until July 25, 2009, before visiting Wolverhampton (July 29 – August 15, 2009), Norwich (August 18 – September 5, 2009), Woking (September 8–26, 2009), Aberdeen (September 30 – October 17, 2009), Glasgow (October 20 – November 14, 2009), Stoke-On-Trent (November 17 – December 5, 2009) and Oxford (December 8, 2009 – January 2, 2010). The show continued to tour in 2010 stopping in Bristol (January 13–30, 2010), Nottingham (February 2–20, 2010), Milton Keynes (February 23 – March 13, 2010), Wimbledon (March 16 – April 3, 2010), Southampton (April 6–24, 2010), Manchester (April 27 – May 15, 2010), Edinburgh (May 18 – June 5, 2010), Hull (June 8–26, 2010), Liverpool (June 29 – July 17, 2010), Dublin (July 29 – August 14, 2010) and finishing in Eastbourne (August 18 – September 4, 2010)

2015-17 West Yorkshire Playhouse and UK and Ireland tour 
A brand new production by Music and Lyrics Productions opened at the West Yorkshire Playhouse for the Christmas 2015 season, directed by artistic director, James Brining and choreographed by Stephen Mear. Following the run at the West Yorkshire Playhouse, the production toured the UK and Ireland starring Jason Manford and Lee Mead as Caractacus Potts opening at the Mayflower Theatre, Southampton (February 10–21, 2016), before stopping in Dublin (February 24 – March 13, 2016), Belfast (March 16–27, 2016), Stoke (March 30 – April 9, 2016), Southend (April 13–24, 2016), Milton Keynes (May 4–14, 2016), Nottingham (May 18–29, 2016), Newcastle (June 1–12, 2016), Sheffield (June 29 – July 17, 2016), Wimbledon (July 20–30, 2016), Cardiff (August 3–21, 2016), Canterbury (August 24 – September 3, 2016), Birmingham (September 7–18, 2016), Northampton (September 21 – October 2, 2016), Edinburgh (October 5–16, 2016), Glasgow (October 19–29, 2016), Woking (November 9–19, 2016), Salford (December 6, 2016 – January 15, 2017) and ended in February 2017 at the Bristol Hippodrome (January 25 – February 4, 2017).  On March 20, 2020, Charles Hanson of Hanson Auctioneers in Staffordshire announced the firm would sell approximately 120 items, including the flying car, from this production on April 20.

Other productions 

The Australian national production of Chitty Chitty Bang Bang opened on November 17, 2012, at the Capitol Theatre in Sydney, featuring David Hobson and Rachael Beck. The German premiere of Chitty Chitty Bang Bang took place on April 30, 2014, at the Prinzregententheater in Munich, translated by Frank Thannhaeuser, directed by Josef E. Koepplinger and choreographed by Ricarda Regina Ludigkeit. The same team staged another production at State Theatre on Gaertnerplatz in early 2020.

Musical numbers

Act 1
Overture — Orchestra
Prologue — Company
"You Two" — Caractacus, Jeremy & Jemima
"Them Three" — Grandpa Potts
"Toot Sweets" — Caractacus, Truly, Lord Scrumptious & Ensemble
"Think Vulgar" (2002–2005) "Act English" (2005–present) — Boris and Goran
"Hushabye Mountain" — Caractacus
"Come to the Funfair" — Company*
"Me Ol' Bamboo" — Caractacus & Ensemble
"Posh!" — Grandpa Potts, Jeremy & Jemima
"Chitty Chitty Bang Bang" — Caractacus, Truly, Jeremy & Jemima, & Grandpa Potts
"Truly Scrumptious" — Jeremy, Jemima & Truly
"Chitty Chitty Bang Bang" (Nautical reprise) — Caractacus, Truly, Jeremy & Jemima
"Chitty Takes Flight" — Company

Act 2
"Entr'acte" — Orchestra
"Vulgarian National Anthem" — Company
"The Roses of Success" — Grandpa Potts & Inventors
"Kiddy-Widdy-Winkies" — Childcatcher*
"Teamwork" — Caractacus, Toymaker, Truly & Juvenile Ensemble
"Chu-Chi Face" — Baron & Baroness Bomburst
"The Bombie Samba" — Baroness, Baron & Ensemble
"Doll on a Music Box"/"Truly Scrumptious" (Reprise) — Truly & Caractacus
"Us Two"/"Chitty Prayer" — Jeremy & Jemima*
"Teamwork" (Reprise) — Toymaker & Company
"Chitty Flies Home (Finale)" — Company

Notes

*Songs were omitted for the 2008 US tour. "Kiddy-Widdy-Winkies" was replaced with a version of "Lovely Lonely Man" from the original film, sung by Truly Scrumptious.

Casts

Notes

Notable London replacements (2002-05) 

 Caractacus Potts: Gary Wilmot, Jason Donovan, Brian Conley
 Truly Scrumptious: Caroline Sheen, Scarlett Strallen, Jo Gibb
 Grandpa Potts: Russ Abbott, Tony Adams
 Baron Bomburst: Victor Spinetti, Christopher Biggins
 Baroness Bomburst: Sandra Dickinson, Louise Gold
 Childcatcher: Paul O'Grady, Peter Polycarpou, Derek Griffiths, Lionel Blair, Stephen Gately, Wayne Sleep, Alvin Stardust
 Goran: Christopher Ryan

Notable UK tour replacements (2005-08) 

 Caractacus Potts: Brian Conley, Gary Wilmot, Joe McFadden, Craig McLachlan, Kevin Kennedy, Matt Baker, Aled Jones
 Grandpa Potts: Gregor Fisher, Tony Adams
 Baron Bomburst: Ken Morley
 Baroness Bomburst: Barbara Rafferty
 The Childcatcher: Kevin Kennedy, Alvin Stardust, Richard O'Brien, Russ Spencer, Ian 'H' Watkins

Notable UK and Ireland tour replacements (2015-17) 

 Caractacus Potts: Jason Manford, Lee Mead
 Truly Scrumptious: Carrie Hope Fletcher
 Baron Bomburst: Phill Jupitus, Shaun Williamson
 Baroness Bomburst: Michelle Collins, Claire Sweeney
 The Childcatcher: Martin Kemp, Jos Vantyler

Awards and nominations

Original London production

Original Broadway production

2015–2017 UK tour

References

External links
 
 Chitty Chitty Bang Bang at the Music Theatre International website
Chitty Chitty Bang Bang at  State Theatre on Gaertnerplatz
 Chitty Chitty Bang Bang on Facebook
 Chitty Chitty Bang Bang on Twitter

West End musicals
Broadway musicals
Musicals by the Sherman Brothers
2002 musicals
Musicals based on films
Musicals based on multiple works
Musicals based on novels
Chitty Chitty Bang Bang
Flying cars in fiction
Plays set in the 1910s
Plays set in England